Chrupalla is the Germanized form of the Polish surname Chrupała. Notable people with the surname include:
Pawel Chrupalla (born 2003), Norwegian footballer of Polish descent
Tino Chrupalla (born 1975), German politician

German-language surnames
Surnames of Polish origin